Jodie Elizabeth Kidd (born 1978) is an English fashion model, racing driver, and television personality.

Early life
Kidd was born in 1978 and is the daughter of the businessman and former showjumper Johnny Kidd. She is the granddaughter of The Honourable Janet Gladys Aitken. One of Kidd's maternal great-grandfathers was the Canadian press baron Max Aitken, 1st Baron Beaverbrook. Kidd's mother, Wendy Madeleine Kidd (née Hodge), is one of the three daughters of Sir John Rowland Hodge, 2nd Baronet, and runs the Holders Festival on Barbados. Kidd's aunt is the model Vicki Hodge.

Jodie was a showjumper as a child and attended St Michael's School, Burton Park, Petworth, West Sussex. Kidd has two siblings. Her elder sister, Jemma Kidd (born 1974), married Arthur Wellesley, Earl of Mornington, son of the current Duke of Wellington, in June 2005. Kidd's brother, Jack Kidd (born 1973) is a polo player. Kidd also has a half brother, the entrepreneur Nick D'Arcy Whiting (born 1962) and a half sister Debbie Parris (born 1964).

Career

Modelling

Kidd was 15 when she was discovered by photographer Terry O'Neil on a beach in Barbados. Her modelling career began when he introduced her to model agent Laraine Ashton. When Kidd began modelling at 16 there was an uproar –  accusations were made that promotion of her slender figure encouraged teenage girls to become anorexic when they tried to mimic her looks. However, following an eight-month break in modelling, Kidd increased weight to become a Size 14 dress size.

Kidd modelled with the leading models from Capellino, Chanel, Ernesto Esposito, Fendissime, Gai Mattiolo, Ghost, Lagerfeld, Malhas, Monsoon, and Motorola and also featured in campaigns for Chloé 'Innocence' perfume and Yves Saint Laurent. She also appeared on the cover of Elle magazine in Australia, Italy, Portugal, Singapore, Sweden and the United States and made appearances on The Face and Comme des Garçons.

In 2014, Kidd was the face of Jaeger's AW/14 campaign. She was one of three iconic British models who were photographed with their mothers, alongside Jasmine Guinness and Kirsty Hume.

Racing

She drove a Maserati and became known for completing the fastest Celebrity Lap in the Suzuki Liana on the Top Gear car show (Series 2 Episode 8 : 6 July 2003). She was later beaten by Simon Cowell (Series 3 Episode 5 : 9 November 2003) and is now ranked 11th fastest.

On 4 December 2004, Kidd and her co-driver, Fabio Babini, took first place in Bologna, Italy at a Maserati Trofeo Pro-Am event. It was only Kidd's third race. She has also taken part in several Gumball 3000 rallies.

Television
Kidd's career as a television personality has included participation on Strictly Come Dancing 2008, in which she partnered with professional dancer Ian Waite; they finished in sixth place, and Kidd left the show in a "dance-off" against former model and television presenter Lisa Snowdon. In 2014, Kidd was a finalist in the BBC's annual cookery programme Celebrity Masterchef; she lost the championship to actor Sophie Thompson. In 2015 she appeared in series 2 of The Jump, where she was sixth to be eliminated. In 2015 Kidd appeared as one of the hosts of the Channel 5 automotive show The Classic Car Show with co-host Quentin Willson.

In the summer of 2015, Kidd was tipped to become Chris Evans's co-host on the revamped Top Gear following Jeremy Clarkson's exit. However she ruled herself out of the job stating that she wanted some time out of the limelight. Kidd also appeared with her son Indio on the fifth series of Big Star's Little Star where they won £9,000 for charity.

Kidd formed part of the ITV4 presenter line up for the Isle of Man TT coverage of 2018.

Musical production
Kidd and her father are producers of the musical Yarico, a tale of romance and slavery in Barbados, based on the 17th-century operetta Yarico and Inkle.

Personal life
Kidd's other hobbies include polo, golf and horse riding.

Following a year long romance and engagement, Kidd married Internet entrepreneur Aidan Butler on 10 September 2005 at St Peter's Church, Twineham, West Sussex. The marriage ended after 18 months.

Kidd's son by her partner Andrea Vianini, an Argentinian polo player, was born on 5 September 2011. Kidd and Vianini's relationship ended in the summer of 2013. Kidd subsequently married Captain David Blakeley. The couple separated in January 2015, after four months of marriage.

Filmography

References

External links

Jodie Kidd at Biogs.com

1978 births
Living people
Aitken family
English female models
English film actresses
English people of Canadian descent
English polo players
English television personalities
Jodie
People from Guildford